Giovanni Garofani (born 20 October 2002) is an Italian footballer who plays as goalkeeper for  club Juventus Next Gen.

Club career 
On 27 November 2020, Andrea Pirlo called up Garofani for an away match against Benevento with the first squad. Garofani made his debut on 15 September 2021 for Juventus U23 in a 3–2 Coppa Italia Serie C win against Feralpisalò. On 17 October, Garofani made his Serie C debut in a 2–1 win against Seregno saving also Iacopo Cernigoi's penalty. After making five appearances, Garofani dislocated his shoulder in November, ruling him out from the pitch for five months. On 25 May 2022, Garofani renewed his contract for Juventus until 2025.

International career 
Garofani represented Italy internationally at under-16,under-17 and under-20.

Career statistics

References

Notelist 

2002 births
Living people
Juventus F.C. players
Juventus Next Gen players
Association football goalkeepers
Italian footballers
Footballers from Rome